William Victor "Bill" Belanger Jr. (October 18, 1928 – December 28, 2018) was an American politician and businessman in the state of Minnesota.

Biography
Belanger was born in Minneapolis, Minnesota and graduated from the DeLaSalle High School in Minneapolis. Belanger served in the United States Army in 1946–1947 and during the Korean War. He graduated from the University of St. Thomas. Belanger worked at Honeywell Defense Systems. Belanger served on the Bloomington, Minnesota city council from 1966 to 1977 and as vice-mayor of Bloomington. Belanger also served on the Bloomington Housing and Redevelopment Authority Commission. He was a Minnesota state senator from District 38 from 1981 to 1982, District 41 from 1982 to 2002, and District 40 from 2003 to 2006. He was married with seven children. Belanger died in Bloomington, Minnesota on December 28, 2018.

References

1928 births
2018 deaths
Minnesota city council members
Republican Party Minnesota state senators
Politicians from Minneapolis
People from Bloomington, Minnesota
Military personnel from Minneapolis
University of St. Thomas (Minnesota) alumni
21st-century American politicians